Francisco Jesus Mendez is a paralympic athlete from Spain competing mainly in category F54 throwing events.

Mendez competed in two paralympics in 1996 Summer Paralympics and 2000 Summer Paralympics both times competing in the shot, discus and javelin.  In 1996 he won a bronze medal in the discus while in 2000 he won one in the shot put.

References

External links
 

Paralympic athletes of Spain
Athletes (track and field) at the 1996 Summer Paralympics
Athletes (track and field) at the 2000 Summer Paralympics
Paralympic bronze medalists for Spain
Living people
Medalists at the 1996 Summer Paralympics
Medalists at the 2000 Summer Paralympics
Year of birth missing (living people)
Paralympic medalists in athletics (track and field)
Spanish male discus throwers
Spanish male shot putters
Wheelchair discus throwers
Wheelchair shot putters
Paralympic discus throwers
Paralympic shot putters